Areius was the name of a number of people from ancient history and mythology:
Areius, Alexandrian philosopher of the 1st century BCE; personal philosopher of Roman emperor Augustus
Lecanius Areius, Greek physician who lived in or before the 1st century CE
Areius Paianieus, archon of Athens in the 2nd century CE
Zeus Areius, cultic epithet of the Greek god Zeus